Dingley Village is a suburb in Melbourne, Victoria, Australia, 23 km south-east of Melbourne's Central Business District, located within the City of Kingston local government area.

History

Dingley was the original name before being renamed to Dingley Village in 1991.

In 1856, Thomas Attenborough bought land in the area and named his house Dingley Grange, after Dingley Hall in Dingley in his native Northamptonshire, England. A farming community developed, relatively remote from either the bayside or Gippsland railway lines, moving into market gardens and poultry to supply metropolitan markets. There was no identifiable centre to the area apart from Christ Church (1873) at the corner of Centre and Old Dandenong Roads. The post office opened on 21 July 1913.

A family of five brothers – the Gartside – solved the problem of vegetable gluts by opening a cannery around 1920. The cannery employed up to 50 local people. The Gartside brothers donated land for the primary school which opened in 1925. In 1936 the Kingswood Golf Club, Dandenong, opened its new course in Dingley. A progress association was formed in 1947 and a recreation reserve acquired in 1954.

Urbanisation in Dingley began in the early 1960s. A small shopping centre, school, kindergarten, reserve and, later, Sunday markets on the reserve created a village atmosphere which resulted in the official change of name.

Two more primary schools, one Catholic, opened later, along with the Spring Park Public Golf course and nearby tennis courts complex. Near the Moorabbin Airport is an industrial zone set in a garden landscape, separated from the Dingley Village residential area by the Mornington Peninsula Freeway.

Dingley Village became part of the municipality of the City of Kingston on 15 December 1994.

It is located by the City of Kingston's green wedge and is bordered to its south by Braeside Park.

The rock band Jet originated from the suburb.

Education

Primary schools 
 Dingley Primary School, established in 1925 and located on the corner of Centre Dandenong and Marcus roads
 Kingswood Primary School established in 1976
 St Mark's Primary School is a Catholic primary school within the Archdiocese of Melbourne

Community facilities

Sporting facilities and clubs 
 Dingley Baseball Club
 Dingley (Dingoes) Football Club competing in the Southern Football League.
 Dingley Village Men's Shed
 Dingley Village Historical Society
 Dingley Village Neighbourhood Centre
 Dingley Goodlife
 Maroons Netball Club
 Dingley Netball Club
 Dingley Tennis Club
 Dingley Cricket Club
 Equest Park Equestrian Centre
 Peninsula Kingswood Country Golf Club
 Southern Golf Club
 Souter and Corrigan Oval
 Spring Park Public Golf Course and Dingley Village Adventure Golf

Churches
Heatherton-Dingley Uniting Church ("The Little White Church on the Corner")

 Christ Church Dingley
 Destiny Church Melbourne
 The Salvation Army – Kingston Gardens
 Village Church
 St Mark's Catholic Church

See also
 City of Springvale – Dingley Village was previously within this former local government area.

References

External links 
 Kingston historical website
 Australian Places - Dingley Village

Suburbs of Melbourne
Suburbs of the City of Kingston (Victoria)